Cinthia Josefina Piñeiro Torres (born February 4, 1986 in Santo Domingo) is a volleyball and beach volleyball player from Dominican Republic, who participated in the NORCECA Beach Volleyball Circuit 2007 with Ysaires Restituyo finishing in 9th place.

She won the gold medal of the Dominican Republic National Championship 2006, partnering Rosalin Angeles.

Clubs
  Bameso (2003)
  Mirador (2004–2005)

References 

 BV Database profile
 FEDOVOLI

1986 births
Living people
Dominican Republic beach volleyball players
Women's beach volleyball players
Dominican Republic women's volleyball players